Máel Muire was an Irish-Gaelic given name.

The name was used by both sexes. For male bearers of the name, see Máel Muire.

Bearers of the name

 Máel Muire ingen Cináeda, daughter of Kenneth MacAlpin and wife of two Irish kings, died 913.
 Máel Muire ingen Neill, died 966.
 Máel Muire bean Flainn, fl. late 9th century.
 Máel Muire ingen Amlaíb, Queen of Ireland, died 1021.

External links
 http://medievalscotland.org/kmo/AnnalsIndex/Feminine/MaelMuire.shtml

Irish-language feminine given names